Lepidochrysops vansoni, the Van Son's blue, is a butterfly of the family Lycaenidae. It is found in Limpopo in South Africa, north to Botswana and Zimbabwe.

The wingspan is 28–34 mm for males and 29–36 mm for females. Adults are on wing from December to March. There is one generation per year, with adults emerging after rains.

The larvae feed on Lantana rugosa, Becium grandiflorum and Ocimum canum.

References

Butterflies described in 1949
Lepidochrysops